Harvinder Singh Kalyan (born 1967) is an Indian politician of Bharatiya Janata Party from Madhuban in Karnal, Haryana, India. He represents Gharaunda constituency of Haryana Legislative Assembly in Karnal district of Haryana.

Personal life
Harvinder Singh Kalyan was born in 1967 in village Kutail near Madhuban of Karnal in Haryana to his farmer father Devi Singh Kalyan (Ex Chairman Haryana Agro Industries Corporation Ltd.(Govt. Of Haryana).

In 1985, he enrolled for the Bachelor of Engineering (Civil engineering) degree from Babasaheb Naik College of Engineering, Pusad (BNCoE, Pusad) (affiliated to Sant Gadge Baba Amravati University) from Pusad town of Yavatmal district in Maharashtra.

He is married to Reshma Kalyan (housewife/writer), daughter of Manohar Naik. Manohar Naik has been elected as Member of the Legislative Assembly from the Pusad (Vidhan Sabha constituency) of the Maharashtra Legislative Assembly in Yavatmal district from 1995 to 1999, 2004–2009, 2009–2014, and 2014–2019.

Political life
Kalyan joined politics under the youth wing of Indian National Congress, which he eventually left to join the Bahujan Samaj Party.

In 2009, contested and lost elections from Gharaunda constituency of Haryana Legislative Assembly as Bahujan Samaj Party candidate.

In July 2014, he left the Bahujan Samaj Party and joined the Bhartiya Janata Party (BJP). On 19 October 2014, he contested and won elections with a margin of 18700 votes from Gharaunda constituency of Haryana Legislative Assembly as a BJP candidate.

See also
 Abhimanyu Sindhu
 Manohar Lal Khattar

References

External links

 Official Website of Harvinder Kalyan

Living people
Bharatiya Janata Party politicians from Haryana
1967 births
People from Karnal
Bahujan Samaj Party politicians from Haryana
Indian National Congress politicians
Haryana MLAs 2014–2019